Ali Diab (born 23 May 1982 in Hafeir al-Fouqa, Rif Dimashq, Syria) is a Syrian professional association football player. He last played for Al-Wahda in the Syrian Premier League, the top division in Syria. He played as a defender, wearing the number 2 jersey for Al-Wahda and for the Syrian national football team he wears the number 3 shirt.

International career
Diab has been a regular for the Syrian national football team since 2004. He made 10 appearances for the Syria during the qualifying rounds of the 2010 FIFA World Cup.

In the 2009 Nehru Cup, Diab scored one goal in Syria's 1–0 victory over India.

Diab was selected to Valeriu Tiţa's 23-man final squad for the 2011 AFC Asian Cup in Qatar. He played in all Syria's three group games against Saudi Arabia, Japan and Jordan. In the match against Jordan, Diab scored an own goal.

International goals
Scores and results table. Syria's goal tally first:

|}

Honour and Titles

National Team
Nehru Cup: runner-up 2007, 2009.

References

External links

1982 births
Living people
Sportspeople from Damascus
Association football defenders
Syrian footballers
Syria international footballers
Syrian expatriate footballers
Expatriate footballers in China
Syrian expatriate sportspeople in China
Expatriate footballers in Iraq
Syrian expatriate sportspeople in Iraq
Al-Majd players
Al-Jaish Damascus players
Shanghai Shenhua F.C. players
Chinese Super League players
Al-Shorta Damascus players
Duhok SC players
2011 AFC Asian Cup players
Syrian Premier League players